Shakhzod Ubaydullaev (Uzbek Cyrillic: Шахзод Убайдуллаев; born 2 March 1998) is an Uzbekistani footballer who plays for Shakhtyor Soligorsk and Uzbekistan national football team.

Career

International
He made his debut for main team, Uzbekistan on 3 September 2020 in a friendly match against Tajikistan. 

Statistics accurate as of match played 3 September 2020.

International goalsScores and results list Uzbekistan's goal tally first.''

Honours

Club
Andijon
 Uzbekistan Pro League (1): 2018

References

External links

1998 births
Living people
Uzbekistani footballers
Uzbekistan international footballers
Uzbekistani expatriate footballers
Expatriate footballers in Belarus
Association football forwards
Uzbekistan Super League players
FK Andijon players
PFK Metallurg Bekabad players
FK Mash'al Mubarek players
FC Shakhtyor Soligorsk players
FC Energetik-BGU Minsk players
FK Neftchi Farg'ona players